Waltham Forest London Borough Council is the local authority for the London Borough of Waltham Forest in London, England which has existed since the London Government Act 1963 was commenced in 1965, replacing three local authorities: Chingford Borough Council, Leyton Borough Council and Walthamstow Borough Council. It is one of London's 32 borough councils, divided into 20 wards and elects 60 councillors.

History

There have previously been a number of local authorities responsible for the area. The current local authority was first elected in 1964, a year before formally coming into its powers and prior to the creation of the London Borough of Waltham Forest on 1 April 1965. Waltham Forest replaced Chingford Borough Council, Leyton Borough Council and Walthamstow Borough Council.

It was envisaged that through the London Government Act 1963 Waltham Forest as a London local authority would share power with the Greater London Council. The split of powers and functions meant that the Greater London Council was responsible for "wide area" services such as fire, ambulance, flood prevention, and refuse disposal; with the local authorities responsible for "personal" services such as social care, libraries, cemeteries and refuse collection. As an outer London borough council it has been an education authority since 1965. This arrangement lasted until 1986 when Waltham Forest London Borough Council gained responsibility for some services that had been provided by the Greater London Council, such as waste disposal. Since 2000 the Greater London Authority has taken some responsibility for highways and planning control from the council, but within the English local government system the council remains a "most purpose" authority in terms of the available range of powers and functions.

Powers and functions
The local authority derives its powers and functions from the London Government Act 1963 and subsequent legislation, and has the powers and functions of a London borough council. It sets council tax and as a billing authority also collects precepts for Greater London Authority functions and business rates. It sets planning policies which complement Greater London Authority and national policies, and decides on almost all planning applications accordingly.  It is a local education authority  and is also responsible for council housing, social services, libraries, waste collection and disposal, traffic, and most roads and environmental health.

Political control
Since the first election to the council in 1964 political control of the council has been held by the following parties:

Summary results of elections

Summary of the council composition after each council election, click on the year for full details of each election.

By-elections occur when seats become vacant between council elections. Below is a summary of recent by-elections.

Notes

References

External links 
 

Local authorities in London
London borough councils
Politics of the London Borough of Waltham Forest
Leader and cabinet executives
Local education authorities in England
Billing authorities in England